Scapherpeton is an extinct genus of prehistoric amphibian. Fossils of it have been found in the Hell Creek Formation.

See also 
 Prehistoric amphibian
 List of prehistoric amphibians

References 

Prehistoric salamanders
Cretaceous amphibians of North America
Cretaceous United States
Hell Creek fauna
Laramie Formation
Cretaceous–Paleogene boundary